Austin Blake Larkin (born April 6, 1995) is an American football defensive end who is a free agent. He played college football at City College of San Francisco, Notre Dame, and Purdue.

College career
Larkin began his college career as a walk-on at the University of Notre Dame as a linebacker. He appeared in a single game during the 2014 season, but did not record any stats. Larkin transferred to the City College of San Francisco for the 2015 season where he switched to defensive end. As a sophomore, he record 38 tackles with 7 sacks. Just hours after finishing a game, Larkin got on a red-eye flight to West Lafayette, Indiana, where Purdue University head coach, Darrell Hazell offered him a scholarship and he accepted.

Professional career

Dallas Cowboys
Larkin signed with the Dallas Cowboys as an undrafted free agent on May 11, 2018. He was waived on September 1, 2018.

Atlanta Falcons
On May 29, 2019, Larkin was signed by the Atlanta Falcons. He was waived on August 31, 2019, and was signed to the practice squad the next day. He was promoted to the active roster on November 23, 2019, but was waived three days later and re-signed to the practice squad. He was promoted back to the active roster on December 17, 2019. He was waived on August 4, 2020.

Carolina Panthers 
Larkin had a tryout with the Tennessee Titans on August 22, 2020. He was signed by the Carolina Panthers on August 28, 2020. He was waived on September 5, 2020, and signed to the practice squad the next day. He was promoted to the active roster on October 17.

On August 8, 2021, Larkin was waived/injured and placed on injured reserve. He was released on August 17. He was re-signed to the Panthers practice squad on October 27. He signed a reserve/future contract with the Panthers on January 10, 2022.

On August 30, 2022, Larkin was waived by the Panthers and signed to the practice squad the next day. He was released on October 18.

Personal
Larkin is the nephew of former Major League Baseball (MLB) player Barry Larkin.

References

External links
Purdue Boilermakers bio
Notre Dame Fighting Irish bio
City College of San Francisco Rams bio
Atlanta Falcons bio

1995 births
Living people
American football defensive ends
Notre Dame Fighting Irish football players
Players of American football from Missouri
City College of San Francisco Rams football players
Purdue Boilermakers football players
Dallas Cowboys players
Atlanta Falcons players
San Antonio Commanders players
Sportspeople from St. Louis County, Missouri
Carolina Panthers players